Aaj Kie Aurat is a 1993 Hindi-language social problem film, produced & directed by Avtar Bhogal on ABC International banner. Starring Jeetendra, Dimple Kapadia  and music composed by Bappi Lahari.

Plot
Roshni lives a middle-classed lifestyle in Bombay along with her widowed mother, and sister, Anju. Her dad was a Police Inspector, and she decides to follow in his footsteps, undergoes training, is appointed with the same title, and takes charge of Santa Cruz Police Station. She gets enough evidence to arrest Dheeraj Kumar, the son of the Home Minister, Anna Patil, but the Court finds Dheeraj not guilty, and Roshni is forced to quit. Then her sister, Anju, is gang raped by Dheeraj and his dozens of goons, goes into a coma. When the Police refuse to take any action, she goes to confront Anna Patil and Dheeraj and is soon on the run from the Police, accused of killing two of Patil's associates. She is subsequently arrested and held in a prison cell and tortured. Her mother's attempts to locate her are in vain. She then attempts to find a lawyer, but no one is willing to take on this case. Then an out of work lawyer, Avinash Kapoor, undertakes to defend Roshni. He meets with her in prison, gets to know her, and listens to her side of the story. Confident that he will secure her release, Roshni testifies in Court. it is here that Avinash will show his true colors, discredits her evidence, and will have her confined in a mental institute. Watch what impact these turn of events will have on Roshni, and her mother.

Cast

Jeetendra as Advocate Avinash Kapoor
Dimple Kapadia as 	Inspector Roshni Verma / Rajni
Anupam Kher as Editor Arun Saxena
Sadashiv Amrapurkar as Home Minister Anna Patil
Goga Kapoor as Advocate Satya Prakash
Deep Dhillon as Mangal Singh / Daku Bhairav Singh
Shashi Puri as Doctor Pankaj Sheth
Ram Mohan as Head of Inquiry Commission
Anand Balraj as Dheeraj Patil
Santosh Gupta(actor) as Munna
Pramod Moutho as Builder Shyam Kumar Gupta
Reema Lagoo as Jail Warden Shanta Patel
Avtar Gill as Inspector Krishnan Shetty
Sujata Mehta as Sunita Menon
Suhas Joshi as Mrs. Verma
Dimpy Ganguly as Anju Verma

Soundtrack

References

External links
 

1993 films
1990s Hindi-language films
Films scored by Bappi Lahiri